Datuna Rakviashvili (Georgian: დათუნა რაქვიაშვილი) was a Deputy State Minister at the State Ministry for Reintegration of Georgia from January 2008 to December 2010. From February 2011 to July 2013 he served as a Deputy Chief of Mission at Embassy of Georgia in US. In October 2016he was appointed as a Secretary of National Security Council of Georgia.

Early life and career 
Rakviashvili was born in Tbilisi, the capital of then-Soviet Georgia in 1968. He studied Geography-Geology at the Ivane Javakhishvili Tbilisi State University during 1985–1992, and International Politics at Georgian Institute of Public Affairs (GIPA) -- and mountain guiding at Swiss Mountain Guide School. He had an extensive mountaineer carrier and founded and led several groups: Georgian Mountaineering and Climbing Association (1993-1996), Georgian Mountain Guide School, (1993-2002), Adventure Tourism School (2015-2017); Georgian Mountain Guide Association (GMGA). Under his leadership GMGA became a candidate member to the UIAGM.

Rakviashvili is co-founder and was chairman of the supervisory board of the Georgian Institute of Public Affairs (2008-2010).

In the capacity of Deputy State Minister for Reintegration he participated in the Geneva discussions and in the Incident Prevention and Response Mechanism (IPRM). He was co-chair of the People to People working group of the U.S. - Georgia Strategic Charter. He worked in various Government of Georgia inter-agency working groups, including NSC council inter-agency group on Threat Assessment and Crisis Management Center Development.

Rakviashvili worked on the State Strategy on Occupied Territories: Engagement through Cooperation and Engagement Action Plan and was liaison with local and international NGOs, international organizations, operating in Abkhazia, Georgia and Tskinvali region, South Ossetia, Georgia. As a Deputy Chief of Mission at the Embassy of Georgia in the US, Rakviashvili was supervising the political and economic departments of the embassy.

Secretary of the National Security Council of Georgia 
On October 24, 2016, President Giorgi Margvelashvili has appointed David Rakviashvili as the new Secretary of the National Security Council (NSC).

Rakviashvili has initiated a shared platform of discussions: “National Security-Whole of a Nation.”  The campaign ensures broad public involvement in developing the country's security policy. Discussions were held on February 25, March 15, April 5 and 10 of 2017 throughout various regions of Georgia.

References 

Living people
1968 births
Diplomats from Tbilisi
Government officials from Georgia (country)